The ninth season of South Park, an American animated television series created by Trey Parker and Matt Stone, began airing on March 9, 2005. The ninth season concluded after 14 episodes on December 7, 2005. All of the episodes in the ninth season were written and directed by Trey Parker.

Episodes

References

External links

 South Park Studios – official website with streaming video of full episodes.
 The Comedy Network – full episodes for Canada

 
2005 American television seasons